Dibri may refer to:
 Dibri (biblical figure)
 Dibri, Iran, a village in East Azerbaijan Province, Iran